John Barr (March 4, 1843 – November 19, 1909) was an Ontario-based Canadian physician and political figure. He represented Dufferin in the Legislative Assembly of Ontario from 1875 to 1879, from 1890 to 1894 and from 1898 to 1904 and in the House of Commons of Canada from 1904 to 1909 as a Conservative member. From 1890 to 1894, he was a member of the provincial Conservative Equal Rights Party.

He was born near Elizabethtown (later Brockville) in Canada West in 1843, the son of Irish immigrants. He graduated as an M.D. from Victoria University in 1866. Barr served as an associated coroner for Grey County. He was Deputy Master in the South Grey County Orange Lodge. Barr first set up practice in Horning's Mills but later moved to Shelburne. In 1880, he married Ermina E. Palmer. After being reelected in 1879, he was unseated after an appeal. He was later reelected several times to the provincial and federal assemblies. He died in office in 1909.

References

The Canadian parliamentary companion, 1891 JA Gemmill

1843 births
1909 deaths
Canadian coroners
Conservative Party of Canada (1867–1942) MPs
Members of the House of Commons of Canada from Ontario
Physicians from Ontario
Progressive Conservative Party of Ontario MPPs